Yamkeshwar is a tehsil in the district of Pauri Garhwal, in the Indian state of Uttarakhand. It comes under Kotdwar sub-division. The place gets its name from the ancient temple of Yamkeshwar, which according to local lore is the place where Markandeya rishi was saved from Yamaraj by God Shiva.

The tehsil is part of Yamkeshwar Assembly constituency and currently represented by Renu Bisht of BJP. The tehsil also has the ancestral village of UP CM Yogi Adityanath.

The tehsil is well connected by road and can be reached either from Haridwar and Rishikesh, or through Kotdwar and Lansdowne. Majority of the Tehsil is rural and hilly area. Most people find employment in agriculture or tourism activities. In 2022, the tehsil was in the news for the Ankita Bhandari murder case.

References

Pauri Garhwal district
Tehsils of India